The 2004/05 season was one of the best seasons of Divizia A in the 21st century. Steaua București became champions of Romania and Dinamo București won the Romanian Cup and the Romanian Super Cup. Rapid won third place in Divizia A.

Divizia A

European Cups

UEFA Champions League

Dinamo București
This section will cover Dinamo's games from July 28, 2004 until the start of August 25, 2004.

UEFA Cup

Steaua București
This section will cover Steaua's games from August 12, 2004 until March 20, 2005.

Oţelul Galaţi
This section will cover Oţelul's games from July 15, 2004 until August 26, 2004.

Dinamo București
This section will cover Dinamo's games from September 16, 2004 until September 30, 2004.

UEFA Intertoto Cup

Gloria Bistriţa
This section will cover Gloria's games from June 20, 2004 until June 27, 2004.

Romania national team
This section will cover Romania's games from Football World Cup 2006 (qualification UEFA).

 
Seasons in Romanian football
Romanian Football